is a Japanese manga artist, best known as the creator of Tsukuyomi: Moon Phase. He was a member of the Manga Dōkōkai OB at Kansai University.

Works
Astro Fujo-san (Kadokawa Shoten)
Eromanō (as Pīttarō Arima, Kaiōsha)
Okiraku Gokuraku Nosutorazamasu (Comic Gum, Wani Books, 2 volumes)
Tsukuyomi: Moon Phase (Comic Gum, Wani Books, 16 volumes)
Uripo!

External links
 Nihon Waru Waru Dōmei (official site)

1969 births
Living people
Kansai University alumni
Manga artists